Epicrocis ferrealis is a species of snout moth in the genus Epicrocis. It was described by George Hampson in 1898. It is found in South Africa and Sudan.

References

Moths described in 1898
Phycitini